St Peter's Well is a rare surviving example of a holy well house or covered well that was built over the waters of a spring in a field below Greenhill Farm, located off Chapel Road near Houston in Renfrewshire, parish of Houston and Kilellan, south-west Scotland.

History
The town of Houston was originally known as Kilpeter i.e. 'Cella Petris'. A chapel was located near by and a local farm was called 'Chapelton'. The holy waters of the well were thought to ensure protection against misadventure, ensuring the safe return of travellers. The age of the present building is uncertain however it was regarded as ancient in Victorian times and it may owe its existence to the availability of suitable worked stone following the abandonment of the old chapel at around the time of the Scottish Reformation in the 16th century.

The Well House

St Peter's Well is a Category B Listed Building, rectangular in shape with a flat ridge or 'saddle-shaped' top and a steeply pitched roof with little ornamentation other than a chamfer on the arch at the entrance. A stone appears to be missing at the closed northern 'gable' end of the well house and no clear indications remain as to whether any form of religious ornamentation existed, such as crosses, ever formed a part of the building. Several cup shaped depressions exist on the ridge and it seems logical that originally another course existed, most likely a single stone extending the length of the building that would seal the building by cover the cross joints of the second course and make it water tight.

St Peter's is a small freestone building, circa 4.5 ft wide and  5.5 ft long. The indications of a hole in each top stone of the sides at the entrance indicates that either typical chained cups were once attached for those taking the waters or a gate over the entrance once existed to keep animals from drinking from within. In the 1880s the well was not being maintained and showed a 'dry stone' method of construction, there being no signs of mortar in the joints and that also hints at the re-use of worked stone from another abandoned building near by, such as the chapel.

At the Scottish Reformation Presbyterian attitudes would have resulted in the removal of overt symbolism and if a 'missing' third course of stone on the roof carried one or two crosses then this might account for any removal. In the 1880s it is recorded as being in danger of collapse however the present structure has been internally consolidated and now has cement between the stones and it appears to be in good overall condition (datum 2018). Curiously the arch stone is clearly shown without a chamfered edge in the detailed 'architects' drawings of 1883 however it does have one at present suggesting that it was turned around during restoration. One of the holes at the front that may have held a chain and cup has been filled in with cement. In 1923 it is recorded as being neglected and uncared for.

The well house is built into a low bank and the spring's waters now flow through the grass into the nearby St Peter's Burn that then continues into the grounds of Houston House. The well is choked with vegetation and the ground in front of the well is so boggy that access is not possible without suitable footwear, a situation that suggests that a direct channel to St Peter's Burn once existed.

St Peter's Fair
St. Peter's Day was June 29 and a very popular fair was once held here which may link to the last echoes of pagan midsummer celebrations. Farmers sold their produce, horse racing took place at Greenhills and at the well, etc.

St Peter's Well in local literature

A local poem has it that whosoever should drink of the holy water would ensure a safe return to Houston:

Micro-history
A religious service is held here annually by the minister and congregation of the parish church of Houston and Kilellen.

See also

Maak's or Monk's Well, Kilmaurs, East Ayrshire
Monk's Well, Chapeltoun, East Ayrshire
St Fillan's Well, Kilallan, Renfrewshire
St Margaret's Well, Edinburgh

References

Bibliography
 Brotchie, T. C. F. (1923). The Borderlands of Glasgow. The Tramway Department. Corporation of Glasgow.
 Houstoniana - An Historical, Antiquarian, Topographical and General Record of the United Parishes of Houston and Kilallan. (1884). Paisley : J. C. Campbell.
 Walker, J R. (1883). Holy Wells in Scotland, Proc Soc Antiq Scot, vol. 17, 1882–3.

External links
Video footage of St Peter's Well

Villages in Renfrewshire
Renfrewshire
History of Renfrewshire
Demolished buildings and structures in Scotland
Buildings and structures in Renfrewshire
Strathgryffe
Districts of Scotland
Christianity in medieval Scotland